Parachrostia pura is a moth of the family Erebidae first described by Michael Fibiger in 2011. It is known from Guizhou in China.

The wingspan is 10–11 mm. The forewings are narrow. The head, thorax and ground colour of the forewings is blackish grey. All lines are black, rather indistinct and waved and the terminal line is well marked by black interveinial dots. The reniform stigma is yellow and black outlined. The hindwings are unicolorous black brown with a discal spot. The fringes of both wings are grey. The underside is unicolorous grey.

The biotope consists of a moist, mainly broad-leaf forest, with lianas and shrubs, close to a river. All specimens were captured at light in mid-September.

References

Micronoctuini
Taxa named by Michael Fibiger
Moths described in 2011